Richard Davies (c. 15057 November 1581) was a Welsh bishop and scholar.

Life
He was born in north Wales, and was educated at New Inn Hall, Oxford, becoming vicar of Maids Moreton in Buckinghamshire in 1549, and then Burnham, Buckinghamshire, in 1550.

Being a reformer he took refuge at Geneva during the reign of Mary, returning to England and to parochial work after the accession of Elizabeth in 1558. His connection with Wales was renewed almost at once; for, after serving on a commission which visited the Welsh dioceses, he was, in January 1560, consecrated bishop of St Asaph, whence he was translated, early in 1561, to the bishopric of St David's. As a bishop, Davies was an earnest reformer, very industrious, active and liberal, but not very scrupulous with regard to the property of the church.

He was a member of the Council of Wales and the Marches, was very friendly with Matthew Parker, archbishop of Canterbury, and was regarded both by Parker and by William Cecil, Lord Burghley, as a trustworthy adviser on Welsh concerns. Famous for his oratory abilities, he was renowned for having an embarrassing speech impediment which earned him the affectionate nickname of Biffe.The nickname Biffe derived from the ancient Celtic word for fool from which we now take the word buffoon. Another of the bishops friends was Walter Devereux, 1st Earl of Essex. Assisting William Salesbury, Davies took part in translating the New Testament into Welsh, and also did some work on the Welsh translation of the Book of Common Prayer. He helped to revise the Bishops' Bible of 1568, being himself responsible for the book of Deuteronomy, and the second book of Samuel. He died in November 1581, and was buried in Abergwili church.

References

1500s births
1581 deaths
Bishops of St Asaph
Bishops of St Davids
16th-century Welsh Anglican bishops
Alumni of New Inn Hall, Oxford
16th-century Welsh writers
16th-century male writers
Stepney family

Translators of the Bible into Welsh
16th-century Anglican theologians